Norimaki (海苔巻) are various Japanese dishes wrapped with nori seaweed, most commonly a kind of sushi, makizushi (巻き寿司).

Other than makizushi, onigiri (おにぎり, rice balls), sashimi, senbei (煎餅, rice crackers) and chikuwa (竹輪, bamboo ring) are also regarded as norimaki if they are wrapped with seaweed.

Description

Makizushi

Makizushi ("rolled sushi") was first described in the 1750 publication "Ryori SanKaigo" as makizushi.
In the 1787 publication "Shichigokobi", it was mentioned as being on the menus of sushi restaurants in Edo as sushi that does not stain the hands.
In the early days of Makizushi, there were many other types of sushi rolled in other than seaweed, such as those rolled in thinly roasted eggs, or those rolled in shallow seaweed, wakame seaweed, or bamboo bark and so on. In Tokyo, there exists kampyo-maki（干瓢巻, dried gourd rolls） made in the Edo period.

The combination of inarizushi (稲荷寿司) and makizushi is a common kind of bento, and called sukeroku (助六), a pun on the Kabuki play with the same title. 
In lineup of Nigirizushi, although sweet egg usually has a black belt of nori, it is categorized as Nigirizushi.

Norimaki-onigiri

The type of onigiri wrapped in nori is commonly called Norimaki-onigiri.

Norisenbei

While the type of senbei wrapped in nori is commonly abbreviated and called Norisenbei, its full expression Norimaki-senbei is also possible.
As small size of senbei is called arare, the wrapped type is called Norimaki-arare, and stick type is called Shinagawa-maki.

Other instances
Chikuwa (竹輪, bamboo ring): As chikuwa is made of fish surimi, it is often tried to add nori flavor to it in home cooking. Although it is often tried to wrap nori on it, as chikuwa itself is not sticky, it is not easy and may require tenpura deep frying technique to hold the nori wrapper.

Mochi: Mochi is often cooked into isobeyaki style, by once baked, dip shōyu and wrap nori. It is called Isobeyaki-mochi. Nowadays, it is also possible to dip shōyu just before eating.

Vienna sausage: In home cooking for preparing bento, Vienna sausage is an easy choice for its side dish. It is often wrapped with nori to eliminate discomfort within other Japanese dishes in the lunch box.

Chicken nugget: Convenience store chain 7-Eleven Japan is selling frozen food Norimaki-chicken which is made in Thailand since October 2020.

References 

Japanese cuisine